Arrosticini are a class of traditional dishes of skewered grilled meat characteristic of Molisana and Abruzzese cuisine (from the Italian region of Abruzzo and Molise). Arrosticini (rustelle or arrustelle in the local dialects; also known as spiedini or spiducci) are typically made from mutton or lamb cut in chunks and pierced by a skewer. It is cooked on a brazier with a typically elongated shape, called furnacella as it resembles a gutter. 

There are two main kinds of arrosticini: those made industrially, consisting of cubical chunks of meat with a side of 1 cm (0.4 inches) on skewers with a maximum length of 10 cm (4 inches); and those made by hand, for which the meat is cut with a knife in chunks of different sizes, alternated on the skewer with pieces of ovine fat. Arrosticini originate from the food consumed by shepherds and other inhabitants of the mountainous areas in Abruzzo within the villages of Castilenti, Civitella Casanova, Carpineto and Villa Celiera who were accustomed to eating even less refined food than hard sheep meat.

Arrosticini are often accompanied by slices of bread soaked in extra-virgin olive oil (pane 'onde). The traditional beverage accompaniment is Montepulciano d'Abruzzo wine. Traditionally, arrosticini are eaten by pulling the meat off the skewer piece by piece using one's teeth.

See also 
 Spiedie, an Italian-American dish descended from arrosticini
 Italian cuisine
 List of Italian dishes
 List of lamb dishes
 Shish kebab

References 

Lamb dishes
Grilled skewers
Italian cuisine
Cuisine of Abruzzo